is a Japanese footballer who plays for Vissel Kobe.

National team career
In May 2017, Fujitani was elected Japan U-20 national team for 2017 U-20 World Cup. At this tournament, he played 2 matches as right side back.

Club statistics
Updated to 13 December 2020.

References

External links

Profile at Vissel Kobe

1997 births
Living people
Association football people from Hyōgo Prefecture
Japanese footballers
Japan youth international footballers
J1 League players
J2 League players
J3 League players
Vissel Kobe players
Giravanz Kitakyushu players
Association football defenders